Shady or shady may refer to:

Places 
 Shady, Iran (disambiguation)
 Şada, Azerbaijan
 Shady, New York
 Shady, Oregon

People

Nickname 
 David Baker (singer), former vocalist with the band, Mercury Rev who produced the album World under the name Shady
 Eminem (born 1972), American rapper whose alter-ego is Slim Shady
 LeSean McCoy (born 1988), American football running back nicknamed "Shady McCoy"
 Shady Blaze (born 1987), American hip hop artist
 Shady Nate (born 1988), American rapper from Oakland

Given name 
 Shady Alsuleiman (born 1978), president of the Australian National Imams Council
 Shady El-Helw (born 1979), Egyptian male water polo player
 Shady Mohamed (born 1977), Egyptian who played professional football

Surname 
 Ruth Shady (born 1946), Peruvian anthropologist and archaeologist

Other uses 
 Shady Records, a record label owned by Eminem
 Shady XV, a hip hop compilation album performed by various artists of Shady Records
 "Shady", a song by Adam Lambert from his 2012 album Trespassing

See also 
 Shade (disambiguation)
 Shady Lady (disambiguation)
 Shadyside (disambiguation)